The Treaty of Yandabo was the peace treaty that ended the First Anglo-Burmese War. The treaty was signed on 24February 1826, nearly two years after the war formally broke out on 5March 1824, by General Sir Archibald Campbell on the British side, and the Governor of Legaing Maha Min Hla Kyaw Htin from the Burmese side, without any due permission and  consent of the Ahom kingdom, Kachari kingdom or the other territories covered in the treaty. With the British army at Yandabo village, only  from the capital Ava, the Burmese were forced to accept the British terms without discussion.

According to the treaty, the Burmese agreed to:
 Cede to the British- Assam, Manipur, Rakhine (Arakan), and the Taninthayi (Tenasserim) coast south of the Salween River.
 Cease all interference in Cachar region of Assam and the Jaintia Hills district.
 Pay an indemnity of one million pounds sterling in four installments.
 Allow an exchange of diplomatic representatives between Ava and Calcutta.
 Sign a commercial treaty in due course.

The treaty ended the longest and most expensive war in British Indian history. Fifteen thousand European and Indian soldiers died, together with an unknown (but almost certainly higher) number of Burmese. The campaign cost the British five million pounds sterling (roughly 18.5 billion in 2006 dollars) to 13 million pounds sterling; this expenditure led to a severe economic crisis in British India in 1833.

For the Burmese, it was to be the beginning of the end of their independence. The Third Burmese Empire, briefly the terror of British India, was effectively undone, crippled and no longer a threat to the eastern frontier of British India. The Burmese would be crushed for years to come by repaying the huge indemnity of one million pounds (then US$5 million), a large sum even in Europe at that time. The British would wage two more wars against the much weaker Burmese, and swallow up the entire country by 1885.

Initial negotiations
The British were already in a commanding position when initial peace negotiations were commenced in September 1825 in Ngagyaungbinzeik, 20 miles north of Pyay (Prome). After their victory at the Battle of Danubyu in April 1825 that killed Burmese commander-in-chief Gen. Maha Bandula, the British consolidated their gains in Lower Burma, Rakhine and Taninthayi coasts as well as in Assam and Manipur. The British demanded that the Burmese recognize independence and "desist from interference with Assam, Manipur and Cachar", "cede Rakhine and its dependencies", receive a British Resident at the Court of Ava, and pay an indemnity of two million pounds sterling. Yangon, and Taninthayi would be held until the indemnity was paid.

The Court of Ava had not expected, and were unwilling to accept, the full dismemberment of their western empire and the crushing penalty demanded. But with the army severely depleted, the Burmese envoy, the lord of Kawlin, replied that his government:
 Would give up any claim to Assam and Manipur
 Objected to the British choice for the future Manipuri raja
 Would cede the Taninthayi coast but not Rakhine.

The British were unimpressed: "The question is not how much you will cede to us but how much we shall return to you".

Breakdown of negotiations 
The negotiations broke down, and the Burmese decided to fight on. In November 1825, the Burmese forces under Maha Ne Myo, mainly consisting of several Shan regiments led by their own Shan sawbwas, made a daring push to recapture Pyay and nearly succeeded. But by early December, the superior firepower of the British had won out and defeated the last-ditch effort by the Burmese.

By the beginning of 1826, the British were making steady advances towards Ava. They captured the ancient city of Pagan on 8 February, and on 16 February, the village of Yandabo, less than 50 miles or four days march away from Ava.

Signing 
Left with little choice, the Burmese sued for peace. The Burmese king Bagyidaw sent a delegation, consisting of one American, one English and two Burmese ministers, to meet the commander of British forces, General Sir Archibald Campbell. Final negotiations were not negotiations at all. The Burmese had to agree to all British demands.

The British demanded and the Burmese agreed to:
 Cede to the British Assam, Manipur, Tripura,  Rakhine (Arakan), and Taninthayi (Tenasserim) coast south of Salween river,
 Cease all interference in Cachar and Jaintia,
 Pay an indemnity of one million pounds sterling in four installments,
 Allow for an exchange of diplomatic representatives between Ava and Calcutta,
 Sign a commercial treaty in due course.

The first installment of indemnity was to be paid immediately, the second installment within the first 100 days from signing of the treaty, and the rest within two years. Until the second installment was paid, the British would not leave Yangon.

The Treaty of Yandabo was signed by Gen. Campbell from the British side and Governor of Legaing Maha Min Hla Kyaw Htin from the Burmese side on 24 February 1826. The Burmese paid 250,000 pounds sterling in gold and silver bullion as the first installment of the indemnity, and also released British prisoners of war.

Aftermath
The treaty imposed a severe financial burden to the Burmese kingdom, and effectively left it crippled. The British terms in the negotiations were strongly influenced by the heavy cost in lives and money which the war had entailed. Some 40,000 British and Indians troops had been involved of whom 15,000 had been killed. The cost to British India's finances had been almost ruinous, amounting to approximately 13 million pounds sterling. The cost of war contributed to a severe economic crisis in India, which by 1833 had bankrupted the Bengal agency houses and cost the British East India Company its remaining privileges, including the monopoly of trade to China.

Territories like Assam became a part of British India. For the Burmese, the treaty was a total humiliation and a long lasting financial burden. A whole generation of men had been wiped out in battle. The world the Burmese knew, of conquest and martial pride, built on the back of impressive military success of the previous 75 years, had come crashing down. The Court of Ava could not come to terms with the loss of the territories, and made unsuccessful attempts to get them back. An invited British Resident in Ava was a daily reminder of humiliation of defeat.

More importantly, the burden of indemnity would leave the royal treasury bankrupt for years. The indemnity of one million pounds sterling would have been considered a colossal sum even in Europe of that time, and it became frightening when translated to Burmese kyat equivalent of 10 million. The cost of living of the average villager in Upper Burma in 1826 was one kyat per month.

The treaty achieved its objective: Leave Burma crippled. Indeed, the British would make two more, much easier, wars against the now much weaker Burmese in 1852 and 1885, eventually annexing the entire country by 1885.

References

External links
Treaty of Yandabo

History of Myanmar
Treaties of Myanmar
Peace treaties of the United Kingdom
1826 treaties
British rule in Burma
First Anglo-Burmese War
History of Assam
Treaties of the British East India Company
1826 in Burma
1826 in the United Kingdom
Myanmar–United Kingdom relations
1826 in British law
February 1826 events